GRB 080916C is a gamma-ray burst (GRB) that was recorded on September 16, 2008, in the Carina constellation and detected by NASA's Fermi Gamma-ray Space Telescope. It is the most powerful gamma-ray burst ever recorded. The explosion had the energy of approximately 9000 type Ia supernovae if the emission was isotropically emitted, and the gas jets emitting the initial gamma rays moved at a minimum velocity of approximately 299,792,158 m/s (99.9999% the speed of light), making this blast the most extreme recorded to date.

The 16.5-second delay for the highest-energy gamma ray observed in this burst is consistent with some theories of quantum gravity, which state that all forms of light may not travel through space at the same speed. Very-high-energy gamma rays may be slowed down as they propagate through the quantum turbulence of space-time.

The explosion took place 12.2 billion light-years (light travel distance) away. That means it occurred 12.2 billion years ago—when the universe was only about 1.5 billion years old. The burst lasted for 23 minutes, almost 700 times as long as the two-second average for high energy GRBs. Follow-up observations were made 32 hours after the blast using the Gamma-Ray Burst Optical/Near-Infrared Detector (GROND) on the 2.2 metre telescope at the European Southern Observatory in La Silla, Chile, allowing astronomers to pinpoint the blast's distance to 12.2 billion light years. The object's redshift is z = 4.35.

If all that energy from GRB 080916C could be captured and converted into usable electricity at 100% efficiency, it would produce enough electricity to supply the entire planet Earth with 13.5 octillion years of power (according to electricity consumption of 2008).

See also 
 GRB 080319B

References

External links 
 Fermi Observations of High-Energy Gamma-Ray Emission from GRB 080916C, Science, February 19, 2009
 Telescope spies cataclysmic blast, BBC News, February 20, 2009
 NASA's Fermi Telescope Sees Most Extreme Gamma-ray Blast Yet, NASA, February 19, 2009
 Record Cosmic Explosion Brightens Student's First Day, Newswise, February 19, 2009

080916C
20080916
September 2008 events
Carina (constellation)